The 2001 Insight.com Bowl was the 13th edition of the Insight.com Bowl. It featured the Syracuse Orangemen, and the Kansas State Wildcats, and it was a rematch of the 1997 Fiesta Bowl, played in nearby Tempe.

Game summary
Syracuse opened the scoring on a 65-yard touchdown run by running back James Mungro making it 7–0 Syracuse. Kansas State's Joe Rheem kicked a 29–yard field goal to pull KSU to 7–3, closing the first quarter scoring. In the second quarter, James Mungro scored on a pair of 1-yard touchdown runs, but on both occasions the extra point fell short, as Syracuse led 19–3. After a scoreless third quarter, backup quarterback RJ Anderson fired a 52-yard touchdown pass to Johnnie Morant making the final score 26–3.

References

Insight.com Bowl
Guaranteed Rate Bowl
Syracuse Orange football bowl games
Kansas State Wildcats football bowl games
Sports in Phoenix, Arizona
December 2001 sports events in the United States
Insight.com Bowl
2000s in Phoenix, Arizona